70 Cancri is a star in the zodiac constellation of Cancer, located around 580 light years from the Sun. It is a challenge to view with the naked eye even under good seeing conditions, having an apparent visual magnitude of 6.7. The star is moving closer to the Earth with a heliocentric radial velocity of -21 km/s, and is expected to come to within  in around nine million years. It is an A-type main-sequence star with a stellar classification of A1V.

References

A-type main-sequence stars
Cancer (constellation)
Durchmusterung objects
Cancri, 70
077557
044512
3601